"All My Love" is a song by American rapper Queen Pen featuring vocals from Eric Williams of R&B group Blackstreet. Sampling Luther Vandross's "Never Too Much", the song was written by Queen Pen, Jay-Z, and Teddy Riley, who also produced the track, and was included on Queen Pen's debut studio album, My Melody, in 1997. The following year, on January 20, "All My Love" was issued as the album's second single. Upon its release, the song reached number 28 on the US Billboard Hot 100 and number 11 on the UK Singles Chart. In New Zealand, the single peaked at number one for four weeks and was certified gold by the Recording Industry Association of New Zealand (RIANZ).

Release and reception
"All My Love" was commercially released in the United States on January 20, 1998 and in the United Kingdom on April 27, 1998. British columnist James Masterton called the track a "brilliant" song and noted that it was a much better effort than Queen Pen's debut, "Man Behind the Music", while Music & Media magazine referred to the song as "catchy beyond belief".

In the US, "All My Love" peaked at number 28 on the Billboard Hot 100, number 17 on the Hot R&B Singles chart, and number 11 on the Hot Rap Songs chart. In Canada, the track rose to number 21 on the RPM Dance ranking. On May 3, 1998, "All My Love" debuted at its peak of number 11 on the UK Singles Chart, staying in the top 100 for five weeks. Across the rest of Europe, the single entered the top 50 in France and Germany. The record was a number-one hit in New Zealand, where it stayed atop the RIANZ Singles Chart for four weeks, earned a gold certification for selling over 5,000 copies, and ended 1998 as the country's 13th-most-successful song.

Track listings

US CD and cassette single
 "All My Love" (LP version) – 3:25
 "No Diggity" (Das Diggity radio) – 4:25

UK CD single
 "All My Love" (radio edit) – 3:50
 "All My Love" (album version) – 3:25
 "Party Ain't a Party" (remix) – 4:36
 "Party Ain't a Party" (album version) – 4:09

UK 12-inch single
A1. "All My Love" (album version) – 3:25
A2. "All My Love" (radio edit) – 3:50
B1. "Party Ain't a Party" (remix) – 4:36
B2. "Party Ain't a Party" (album version) – 4:09

UK cassette single
 "All My Love" (radio edit) – 3:50
 "All My Love" (album version) – 3:25

European CD single
 "All My Love" (radio mix) – 3:26
 "All My Love" (hook first) – 3:51

European maxi-CD single
 "All My Love" (radio mix) – 3:26
 "All My Love" (hook first) – 3:51
 Excerpts from My Melody ("It's True"/"Get Away"/"Girlfriend")

Personnel
Personnel are lifted from the US CD single liner notes.
 Jay-Z – writing (as Shawn Carter)
 Teddy Riley – writing, all instruments, production, programming, arrangement
 Queen Pen – writing (as Lynise Walters), vocals
 Luther Vandross – writing ("Never Too Much")
 Eric Williams – featured vocals

Charts

Weekly charts

Year-end charts

Certifications

Release history

References

1997 songs
1998 singles
Interscope Records singles
Number-one singles in New Zealand
Song recordings produced by Teddy Riley
Songs written by Jay-Z
Songs written by Luther Vandross
Songs written by Teddy Riley